The 2004 FINA Men's Water Polo World League was the third edition of the annual event, organised by the world's governing body in aquatics, the FINA. After a preliminary round, the Super Final was held in Long Beach, United States.

Preliminary round

Pool winners advanced to the semifinals, while the second and third placed teams in each pool competed in the quarterfinals. The bottom team in each pool was eliminated.

Group A

Group B

Super Final

Quarterfinals

Semifinals

Fifth place match

Bronze medal match

Gold medal match

Final ranking

Awards

References

 Sports123

2004
W
W
International water polo competitions hosted by the United States